The 1991 Pittsburgh Steelers season was the franchise's 59th season as a professional sports franchise and as a member of the National Football League (NFL).

The Steelers struggled early as Neil O'Donnell took over from Bubby Brister at quarterback. The Steelers ended the season winning their last two games, 17–10, over the Cincinnati Bengals and Cleveland Browns at Three Rivers Stadium to finish with a 7–9 record. Following the season Chuck Noll announced his retirement, ending his 23-year career in which he won four Super Bowls while posting an overall record of 209–156–1.

Offseason

NFL draft

Staff

Notable additions include Adrian Cooper, Neil O'Donnell and Ernie Mills.

Roster

Preseason

Schedule

Regular season

Schedule

Game summaries

Week 1 (Sunday September 1, 1991): vs. San Diego Chargers 

at Three Rivers Stadium, Pittsburgh, Pennsylvania

 Game time: 4:00 PM EDT
 Game weather: 80 °F (Sunny)
 Game attendance: 55,848
 Referee: Gerald Austin
 TV announcers: (NBC) Joel Meyers (play by play), Dan Hampton (color commentator)

Scoring drives:

 Pittsburgh – FG Anderson 38
 San Diego – FG Carney 48
 Pittsburgh – Calloway 33 pass from Brister (Anderson kick)
 Pittsburgh – FG Anderson 29
 Pittsburgh – FG Anderson 31
 Pittsburgh – FG Anderson 39
 San Diego – Lewis 11 pass from Bernstine (Carney kick)
 San Diego – FG Carney 35
 Pittsburgh – Stone 89 pass from O'Donnell (Anderson kick)
 San Diego – Jefferson 5 pass from Friesz (Carney kick)

Week 2 (Sunday September 8, 1991): at Buffalo Bills  

at Rich Stadium, Orchard Park, New York

 Game time: 1:00 PM EDT
 Game weather: 84 °F (Sunny)
 Game attendance: 79,545
 Referee: Tom Dooley
 TV announcers: (NBC) Tom Hammond (play by play), Joe Namath (color commentator)

Scoring drives:

 Buffalo – Lofton 53 pass from Kelly (Norwood kick)
 Buffalo – FG Norwood 50
 Pittsburgh – FG Anderson 25
 Buffalo – Beebe 34 pass from Kelly (Norwood kick)
 Buffalo – Beebe 14 pass from Kelly (Norwood kick)
 Pittsburgh – Foster 56 run (Anderson kick)
 Buffalo – Reed 14 pass from Kelly (Norwood kick)
 PIttsburgh – W. Williams 1 run (Anderson kick)
 Pittsburgh – Hinkle 57 interception return (Anderson kick)
 Pittsburgh – FG Anderson 27
 Buffalo – Beebe 11 pass from Kelly (Norwood kick)
 Buffalo – Beebe 4 pass from Kelly (Norwood kick)
 Buffalo – Odomes 32 interception return (Norwood kick)
 Pittsburgh – Hoge 1 run (Anderson kick)

Week 3 (Sunday September 15, 1991): vs. New England Patriots  

at Three Rivers Stadium, Pittsburgh, Pennsylvania

 Game time: 1:00 PM EDT
 Game weather: 86 °F (Sunny)
 Game attendance: 53,703
 Referee: Johnny Grier
 TV announcers: (NBC) Joel Meyers (play by play), Dan Hampton (color commentator)

Scoring drives:

 Pittsburgh – FG Anderson 49
 New England – FG Staurovsky 33
 New England – FG Staurovsky 28
 Pittsburgh – FG Anderson 32
 Pittsburgh – Green 32 pass from Brister (Anderson kick)
 Pittsburgh – Mills recovered blocked punt in end zone (Anderson kick)

Week 4 (Sunday September 22, 1991): at Philadelphia Eagles  

at Veterans Stadium, Philadelphia, Pennsylvania

 Game time: 1:00 PM EDT
 Game weather: 66 °F (Mostly Sunny)
 Game attendance: 65,511
 Referee: Bernie Kukar
 TV announcers: (NBC) Marv Albert (play by play), Bill Parcells (color commentator)

Scoring drives:

 Pittsburgh – Hoge 12 pass from Brister (Anderson kick)
 Philadelphia – McMahon 1 run (Ruzek kick)
 Pittsburgh – Green 8 pass from Brister (Anderson kick)
 Philadelphia – FG Ruzek 27
 Philadelphia – FG Ruzek 34
 Philadelphia – Drummond 2 run (Ruzek kick)
 Philadelphia – FG Ruzek 20

Week 5 (Sunday September 29, 1991): Bye Week

Week 6 (Sunday October 6, 1991): at Indianapolis Colts  

at Hoosier Dome, Indianapolis, Indiana

 Game time: 8:00 PM EDT
 Game weather: Dome
 Game attendance: 55,383
 Referee: Larry Nemmers
 TV announcers: (TNT) Skip Caray (play by play), Pat Haden (color commentator)

Scoring drives:

 Indianapolis – FG Biasucci 19
 Pittsburgh – Green 21 pass from Brister (Anderson kick)
 Pittsburgh – Foster 24 pass from Brister (Anderson kick)
 Pittsburgh – Hoge 1 run (Anderson kick)

Week 7 (Monday October 14, 1991): vs. New York Giants  

at Three Rivers Stadium, Pittsburgh, Pennsylvania

 Game time: 9:00 PM EDT
 Game weather: 59 °F (Cloudy)
 Game attendance: 57,608
 Referee: Red Cashion
 TV announcers: (ABC) Al Michaels (play by play), Frank Gifford & Dan Dierdorf (color commentators)

Scoring drives:

 New York Giants – Cross 12 pass from Hostetler (Bahr kick)
 New York Giants – FG Bahr 45
 New York Giants – FG Bahr 40
 New York Giants – Meggett 30 run (Bahr kick)
 Pittsburgh – FG Anderson 26
 Pittsburgh – FG Anderson 39
 Pittsburgh – Lipps 16 pass from O'Donnell (Anderson kick)
 Pittsburgh – Green 5 pass from O'Donnell (Anderson kick)
 New York Giants – FG Bahr 44

Week 8 (Sunday October 20, 1991): vs. Seattle Seahawks  

at Three Rivers Stadium, Pittsburgh, Pennsylvania

 Game time: 1:00 PM EDT
 Game weather: 47 °F (Partly Sunny)
 Game attendance: 54,678
 Referee: Gordon McCarter
 TV announcers: (NBC) Mel Proctor (play by play), Joe Namath (color commentator)

Scoring drives:

 Seattle – FG Kasay 36
 Seattle – Williams 1 run (Kasay kick)
 Seattle – Chadwick 14 pass from Krieg (Kasay kick)
 Pittsburgh – Stone 57 pass from O'Donnell (Anderson kick)
 Seattle – FG Kasay 21
 Seattle – Tice 1 pass from Krieg (Kasay kick)

Week 9 (Sunday October 27, 1991): at Cleveland Browns  

at Cleveland Municipal Stadium, Cleveland, Ohio

 Game time: 4:00 PM EST
 Game weather:
 Game attendance: 78,285
 Referee: Bob McElwee
 TV announcers: (NBC) Don Criqui (play by play), Bob Trumpy (color commentator)

Scoring drives:

 Cleveland – FG Stover 34
 Cleveland – Hoard 2 pass from Kosar (Stover kick)
 Pittsburgh – O'Donnell 1 run (Anderson kick)
 Cleveland – Mack 1 run (Stover kick)
 Pittsburgh – W. Williams 1 run (Anderson kick)

Week 10 (Sunday November 3, 1991): at Denver Broncos  

at Mile High Stadium, Denver, Colorado

 Game time: 8:00 PM EST
 Game weather: 16 °F, wind 8 mph
 Game attendance: 70,973
 Referee: Dale Hamer
 TV announcers: (ESPN) Mike Patrick (play by play), Joe Theismann (color commentator)

Scoring drives:

 Pittsburgh – FG Anderson 26
 Pittsburgh – Green 23 pass from O'Donnell (Anderson kick)
 Denver – Lewis 1 run (Treadwell kick)
 Denver – Elway 4 run (Treadwell kick)
 Denver – FG Treadwell 28
 Denver – FG Treadwell 21
 Pittsburgh – FG Anderson 39

Week 11 (Sunday November 10, 1991): at Cincinnati Bengals  

at Riverfront Stadium, Cincinnati, Ohio

 Game time: 1:00 PM EST
 Game weather:
 Game attendance: 55,503
 Referee: Jerry Markbreit
 TV announcers: (NBC) Joel Meyers (play by play), Dan Hampton (color commentator)

Scoring drives:

 Cincinnati – FG Breech 29
 Cincinnati – Woods 4 run (Breech kick)
 Pittsburgh – FG Anderson 44
 Cincinnati – Holman 18 pass from Esiason (Breech kick)
 Pittsburgh – FG Anderson 46
 Pittsburgh – J. Williams 38 fumble return (Anderson kick)
 Cincinnati – Woods 1 run (Breech kick)
 Pittsburgh – Mills 35 pass from O'Donnell (Anderson kick)
 Pittsburgh – Lipps 12 pass from O'Donnell (Anderson kick)
 Cincinnati – FG Breech 47
 Pittsburgh – Green 26 pass from O'Donnell

Week 12 (Sunday November 17, 1991): vs. Washington Redskins  

at Three Rivers Stadium, Pittsburgh, Pennsylvania

 Game time: 1:00 PM EST
 Game weather: 47 °F (Sunny)
 Game attendance: 56,813
 Referee: Tom White
 TV announcers: (CBS) Dick Stockton (play by play), Merlin Olsen (color commentator)

Scoring drives:

 Washington – Riggs 1 run (Lohmiller kick)
 Washington – FG Lohmiller 36
 Washington – Monk 11 pass from Rypien (Lohmiller kick)
 Washington – FG Lohmiller 41
 Washington – Riggs 1 run (Lohmiller kick)
 Pittsburgh – Cooper 5 pass from O'Donnell (Anderson kick)
 Pittsburgh – Stone 40 pass from O'Donnell (Anderson kick)
 Washington – Clark 49 pass from Rypien (Lohmiller kick)
 Washington – Sanders 40 pass from Rutledge (Lohmiller kick)

Week 13 (Sunday November 24, 1991): vs. Houston Oilers  

at Three Rivers Stadium, Pittsburgh, Pennsylvania

 Game time: 1:00 PM EST
 Game weather: 34 °F (Cloudy)
 Game attendance: 45,795
 Referee: Howard Roe
 TV announcers: (NBC) Don Criqui (play by play), Bob Trumpy (color commentator)

Scoring drives:

 Pittsburgh – FG Anderson 20
 Pittsburgh – FG Anderson 28
 Houston – Givins 10 pass from Moon (Del Greco kick)
 Pittsburgh – FG Anderson 33
 Pittsburgh – Stone 43 pass from O'Donnell (Anderson kick)
 Pittsburgh – W. Williams 1 run (Anderson kick)
 Houston – Jeffries 15 pass from Moon (Del Greco kick)
 Pittsburgh – FG Anderson 24

Week 14 (Thursday November 28, 1991): at Dallas Cowboys  

at Texas Stadium, Irving, Texas

 Game time: 4:00 PM EST
 Game weather:
 Game attendance: 62,253
 Referee: Red Cashion
 TV announcers: (NBC) Dick Enberg (play by play), Bill Walsh (color commentator)

Scoring drives:

 Dallas – E. Smith 6 run (Willis kick)
 Dallas – FG Willis 19
 Pittsburgh – FG Anderson 42
 Dallas – FG Willis 43
 Pittsburgh – W. Williams 3 run (Anderson kick)
 Dallas – Irvin 66 pass from Beuerlein (Willis kick)

Week 15 (Sunday December 8, 1991): at Houston Oilers  

at Astrodome, Houston, Texas

 Game time: 1:00 PM EST
 Game weather: Dome
 Game attendance: 59,225
 Referee: Bob McElwee
 TV announcers: (NBC) Charlie Jones (play by play), Todd Christensen (color commentator)

Scoring drives:

 Houston – Pinkett 7 run (Del Greco kick)
 Houston – FG Del Greco 24
 Pittsburgh – FG Anderson 54
 Houston – Jeffires 16 pass from Moon (Del Greco kick)
 Pittsburgh – FG Anderson 36
 Houston – Pinkett 11 run (Del Greco kick)
 Houston – A. Smith 70 fumble return (Del Greco kick)

Week 16 vs Bengals

Week 17 vs Browns 

Chuck Noll's final game as head coach

Standings

References

External links
 1991 Pittsburgh Steelers season at Pro Football Reference 
 1991 Pittsburgh Steelers season statistics at jt-sw.com

Pittsburgh Steelers seasons
Pittsburgh Steelers
Pitts